The Queen Anne Counterbalance was a funicular streetcar line operated by the Seattle Electric Company, serving the steep slope along its namesake street on Queen Anne Hill in Seattle, Washington, from 1901 to 1940. It replaced an earlier cable car line built by the Front Street Cable Railway in 1891.

Design

The steep hill along Queen Anne Avenue has grades of up to 19 percent between Mercer and Comstock. The initial cable car service to the top of the hill that was completed in 1891 used a route north via Second Avenue from the existing cable car powerhouse at Denny Way and 2nd, west via Aloha Street to Queen Anne Avenue, then north via Queen Anne to the terminus at Highland Drive. After Seattle Electric Company took over the Front Street Cable Railway in 1900, the line was electrified, rerouted, and combined with the Front Street line as the West Queen Anne line, which ran north/northwest from Pioneer Square (Walker and First Ave S) to Seventh Ave W and W McGraw St via Queen Anne and Galer. Although most of the route was operated using the electric traction motors alone, the Counterbalance portion of the West Queen Anne line used counterweight assistance to ascend and descend approximately half of the route along Queen Anne Avenue; this subsection ran north–south between Roy and Comstock.

The counterbalance that began operation in 1901 used an underground cable that looped around two sheaves each  in diameter; the sheaves were at the top (under the intersection with Comstock) and bottom (Roy) of the hill. The surface-running passenger streetcar attached to the upper cable length and ran on tracks at street level. The lower cable length was connected to a rail car counterweight that ran on a parallel set of tracks in an underground tunnel below the surface tracks. When the streetcar ascended or descended, it would be counterbalanced by the descending/ascending rail car. The counterweight rail car was equipped with a spring-loaded safety stop that would automatically stop the car if the cable broke.

At the top and bottom of the hill, the streetcar would stop so that attendants stationed in small booths could engage (or disengage) the streetcar from the counterbalance cable and adjust the weight of the counterbalance rail car; the work-intensive attachment and adjustment processes limited minimum headways to 12 minutes. The conductor controlled a cross-bar attached to the streetcar; the bar dropped into a notch cut into the center of the plow.

This design was invented by J.P.F. Kuhlmann, a civil engineer in Seattle, and was implemented earlier in that city on Washington Avenue (1891, 16% grade) and on Rainier Avenue (17% grade). Outside of Seattle, the Kuhlmann design also was used on the Front Street route (14% grade) of the City & West Portland Motor Line in Portland, Oregon, the College Hill line (15% grade) of the Union Railroad in Providence, Rhode Island, and the Selby Avenue line (1898, 16% grade) in St. Paul, Minnesota. The Queen Anne Counterbalance had the largest tunnel and counterweight car of all the Kuhlmann systems. A similar underground counterweight system was used for the Balmain Tramway extension, but with horizontal sheaves.

In 1902, a parallel set of tracks were added on the west side of Queen Anne Avenue, with a second underground tunnel and independent counterweight railcar. That year, Seattle Electric Company also purchased ten new streetcars to serve the line, numbered 311 to 320, which were built by the Stephenson Car Company. Most served until service over the line was discontinued in 1940. In 1908, the first tunnel was rebuilt with reinforced concrete supports.

History
Initially, the Front Street Cable Railway (FSCRy) started a cable car franchise in 1889, connecting Pioneer Square and Denny Way via Front Street (now First Avenue) in Seattle. FSCRy extended its line north to Highland Drive via 2nd, Aloha, and Queen Anne under a subsidiary called the North Seattle Cable Railway Company in 1891. Cable cars, as designed for hilly San Francisco, were ideal for the steep northernmost blocks of the extended line.

The panic of 1893 left the company weak and after going bankrupt in 1898, FSCRy and its franchises were acquired by  a division of Stone & Webster, the Seattle Electric Company, in 1900. Seattle Electric promptly started electrifying the cable car lines to reduce operating costs. Due to the extreme grade of the northernmost blocks along Queen Anne (between Mercer and Comstock), electric streetcars would have to rely on a counterbalance system to supplement their motors, leaving it as one of the last cable car lines in Seattle. By early 1901, the Queen Anne Counterbalance began operation with a single track.

In May 1901, Seattle Electric advanced a plan to tunnel beneath Queen Anne Hill to replace the counterbalance, but the idea was unpopular and not pursued further. The first serious mishap occurred less than a week later, after a counterweight cable snapped, releasing the railcar counterweight, which shot downhill and buried itself at the bottom, shutting down operations for two days. By 1903, the street had been paved. Seattle Electric was purchased by the city in 1919 for $15 million and the streetcar system, including the Counterbalance, was operated by the city as the Seattle Municipal Street Railway.

On March 5, 1937, the Seattle Municipal Street Railway held a race between the Counterbalance and a new trolleybus, powered by a temporary overhead line; the trolleybus, laden with 92 passengers, finished climbing the hill in a minute and a half, well ahead of the streetcar, which finished in just over three minutes despite the latter being given a head start from halfway up the hill. The race was arranged by the engineering firm of John C. Beeler to support its plan to convert the streetcar system to trolleybuses, but voters rejected Proposition A on March 9, 1937, which would have issued $11.6 million in bonds to finance the conversion and settle the remaining debt from the 1919 purchase of Seattle Electric. Eventually, with the help of a federal loan, the city began converting its streetcar system to trolleybuses, and the first "trackless trolley" started revenue service on April 28, 1940.

The West Queen Anne streetcar line finished its final run at approximately 2:30 AM on the morning of August 11, 1940; that run was swamped by a "mob of 70 Queen Anne youths" who took over the streetcar after it was stopped by an improvised barricade of garbage cans at the intersection of Queen Anne and Galer. By that time, the operator had already dealt with grease on the tracks; the youths dispersed the 40 passengers on board by pelting them with rotten fruits and vegetables. Over the next hour, the mob broke all the windows on the streetcar and stripped it of its seats, straps, and light bulbs. 20 were arrested later in connection with the wild scene; the operator asked the court to dismiss the charges just before the trial, scheduled for September 16, was to start.

A trolleybus line assumed service over Queen Anne starting on September 2, 1940 but the tunnels were retained in case the counterweight railcars were needed to assist the trolleybuses during winter. The surface tracks and cable slots were removed in 1943. The West Queen Anne streetcar line north of Denny Way, including the Counterbalance section, is mostly duplicated by the modern King County Metro trolleybus line operated as Route 2. , the underground tunnels and counterweight cars are still present and undisturbed.

Legacy
 The portion of Queen Anne Avenue North and the hill itself on which the cable car counterweight system ran are also known locally as the Counterbalance.
 Several businesses in the neighborhood were named (or renamed) for the Counterbalance.
 The fictional radio psychiatrist Frasier Crane mentioned his residence was "on the Counterbalance" in the Season 1 episode "Can't Buy Me Love" of the eponymous TV series. The view from his condominium was actually taken from nearby Kerry Park.
 When weather conditions are snowy and icy, the City of Seattle closes the Counterbalance route. Social media users post videos of cars that have ignored these signs and attempt to drive up and down the hill.

Counterbalance Park

Counterbalance Park: An Urban Oasis is a small  municipal park at 700 Queen Anne Ave N. (northeast corner of the intersection with Roy St), named for the Counterbalance line which ran nearby. It was designed by landscape architect Robert Murase and artist Iole Alessandrini. The Pro Parks Levy, approved by voters in November 2000, made funds available to acquire a park site tentatively named Queen Anne Park; the identified site was formerly occupied by a gasoline station, and was purchased by the City of Seattle in 2004. The design was largely complete by October 2005, when it was presented to the Seattle Design Commission, and detail modifications were made for a follow-up review in March 2007; by then the park had received its current name. The park was completed in 2008 and a ribbon-cutting ceremony was held on July 19.

The original design was a plaza with shade trees lining the concrete retaining walls on the north and east edges of the plaza; there is a narrow outer area paralleling each street covered with ipe wood decking, and a larger inner area covered with decomposed granite. The inner area was set off from the outer ipe decking with a lit, elevated corner, which would be echoed by uplighting on the north and east retaining walls. Originally, Counterbalance Park was designed by Murase with a water feature flowing over boulders in the northeast corner of the inner area; however, due to budget constraints, this was never implemented. The park was completed under a public-private partnership, with private donors contributing approximately half the cost of construction. To honor the private donor that made the largest single contribution, an "art element" was added consisting of five sculpted rocks. The implemented "art element" was criticized because the final designs were never reviewed or approved by Seattle Parks staff prior to installation, and the execution was seen as inelegant.

The park was panned initially as unimpressive and uninviting. After the lighting system designed by Alessandrini and Murase was debugged, programmable LED fixtures illuminate the park's vertical concrete retaining walls and corner element from 5 PM to 2 AM nightly and the site was praised as "Seattle's best after-hours park", provided that foot traffic would increase.

See also
 Great Incline, a similar contemporaneous line on Mount Lowe near Pasadena (1893–1938)
 Fillmore Counterbalance, a similar contemporaneous line in San Francisco (1895–1941)

Notes

References

External links

1891 establishments in Washington (state)
1940 disestablishments in Washington (state)
Cable car railways in the United States
Streetcars in Washington (state)
Transportation in Seattle
Tram, urban railway and trolley companies
History of Seattle